Kilbirnie Auld Kirk is a Church of Scotland congregation on Dalry Road (at Kirkland Road), Kilbirnie, North Ayrshire, Scotland. Although the building dates back to the 15th century, the present congregation was formed in 1978 by the amalgamation of the Glengarnock Parish Church and the Barony Church.

History 
 
Previously known as "The Barony Church", after the barony that had been obtained by John Craufurd of Kilbirnie in 1641, the church is constructed on the site of a 6th-century monastic cell. The town of Kilbirnie derives its name from the church. The name is Gaelic in origin and means "Church of St Brendan" (the Gaelic cil, pronounced 'kil', signifying a church, suffixed by the name of the saint). "Auld Kirk" in Scots simply means Old Church.

The Craufurd tomb contains the effigies of Captain Thomas Craufurd of Jordanhill and his wife Janet ker of Kersland. Thomas died on 3 January 1603 having achieved fame through capturing Dumbarton Castle for King James VI, for which brave achievement he was given the lands of Jordanhill near Glasgow as a reward. The inscription on the tomb reads GOD SCHAW THE RICHT. HEIR LYIS THOMAS CRAUFURD OF IORDANHILL SEXT SON TO LAURENCE CRAUFURD OF KILBIRNY AND IONET KER HIS SPOUS ELDEST DOCHTER TO ROBERT FER OF KERRISLAND 1594.

Architecture 
The original nave dates from 1470, with a two-stage bell tower added twenty years later. Aisles were added in 1597 for the Cunninghames of Glengarnock and in 1642 for the Crawfords. A transept and new entrance front were added in 1903-05. 

The church has some magnificent fittings, pride of place going to the elaborately detailed Crawford Loft of circa 1705, and to the 17th-century sounding board above the pulpit. Many of the windows have been decorated in stained glass.

"Kilbirnie Auld Kirk and Cemetery Walls" are a category 'A' listed historic building.

See also
 Birnie Kirk

References

External links
 Commentary & video on the Craufurd of Jordanhill tomb

Church of Scotland churches in Scotland
Garnock Valley
Category A listed buildings in North Ayrshire
Listed churches in North Ayrshire